Singapore has competed in all editions of the Asian Games since it was first held in 1951, one of only seven countries to do so.

Overall medal tally
With 154 medals, Singapore is currently fifteen in the all-time tally of medals.

Medals by Summer Sport

Asian Para Games

References

Singapore at the Asian Games